Munster Reds is an Irish inter-provincial cricket team based in Cork, in the province of Munster. In April 2017, Cricket Ireland approved the participation of the team in the Interprovincial Twenty20 Cup, the highest level of T20 domestic cricket in Ireland. They joined Leinster Lightning, North West Warriors and Northern Knights in the 2017 tournament. They played their first match in the Inter-Provincial Trophy on 26 May 2017, and won their first match, against North West Warriors, on 6 July 2018. Following the successful end to their 2018 season, there was talk of Munster Reds being included in the Interprovincial One-Day Trophy competition, but while this is an objective of Cricket Ireland, it was confirmed this would not happen in 2019. In February 2021, Cricket Ireland confirmed that the team would take part in the 2021 tournament. Munster won their inaugural Inter-Provincial title when they won the 2022 Inter-Provincial Cup.

Current squad
  denotes players with international caps.
On 4 April, it was announced that Neil Rock would move to the Northern Knights with PJ Moor taking his place in the Munster Reds 12 man core squad for the 2021 season.

Notable players
See List of Munster Reds List A cricketers and List of Munster Reds Twenty20 players

Grounds
Munster Reds play their home Twenty20 fixtures at The Mardyke in Cork, with the ground so far hosting two matches.

References

External links
Munster Reds official website

 
Cricket teams in Ireland
2017 establishments in Ireland
Cricket in County Cork
Sports clubs in County Cork